Neolampedusa obliquator is a species of beetle in the family Cerambycidae. It was described by Johan Christian Fabricius in 1801. It is known from Brazil, French Guiana, and Peru.

References

Onciderini
Beetles described in 1801